Pocota is a genus hoverflies, from the family Syrphidae, in the order Diptera.

Species
P. bomboides Hunter, 1897
P. personata (Harris, 1780)
P. stackelbergi Violovich, 1957

References

Hoverfly genera
Diptera of North America
Diptera of Europe
Diptera of Asia
Taxa named by Amédée Louis Michel le Peletier
Taxa named by Jean Guillaume Audinet-Serville